Matthew Simpson (born March 30, 1990) is an American goalball player. Simpson represented the United States at the 2016 Summer Paralympics and won a silver medal.

Early life 
When Simpson was about a year old, he began moving his eye in unusual ways. The doctors who first examined him believed it was a condition he would grow out of, but once he started sitting unusually close to the family television, his parents suspected a more serious condition. When he was 4 years old, he was diagnosed with a degenerative retinal condition that would eventually leave him blind. In later years, Simpson would consider learning about his diagnosis that early to be a blessing in disguise, telling an interviewer for a University of Virginia publication in 2019, "As a kid, you don’t really think about it. You don’t dwell on it. You kind of get used to the idea of what your life is going to be like."

While he was a devoted fan of baseball in general and the Atlanta Braves in particular, he realized that playing it would not be an option due to his vision impairment. He first turned to swimming and running, but took to goalball once he was exposed to the sport at a summer camp at age 10. Upon returning from camp, he told his father that he would play goalball in the Paralympics. At the time, there was no goalball program in the Atlanta area, but his father started one with the help of the Georgia Blind Sports Association.

Education
Simpson graduated from Washington and Lee University in 2012, after which he worked in Colorado for the United States Association of Blind Athletes. After winning a silver medal at the 2016 Summer Paralympics, Simpson attended the University of Virginia School of Law and graduated in 2020. He currently works as an associate for Sidley Austin.

Career
Simpson first made the United States national team in 2011 while a student at Washington and Lee, going on to represent the US at the Parapan American Games and win silver medals in 2015 and 2019.

He represented the United States at the 2016 Summer Paralympics in goalball and won a silver medal. He will again represent the United States at the 2020 Summer Paralympics.

References

External links 
 
 

1990 births
Living people
Male goalball players
Paralympic goalball players of the United States
Paralympic silver medalists for the United States
Paralympic medalists in goalball
Goalball players at the 2016 Summer Paralympics
Medalists at the 2016 Summer Paralympics
Medalists at the 2015 Parapan American Games
Medalists at the 2019 Parapan American Games
Sportspeople from Atlanta
Goalball players at the 2020 Summer Paralympics
University of Virginia School of Law alumni
Washington and Lee University alumni
People associated with Sidley Austin